Gigi Loren Lazzarato Getty (born Gregory Allan Lazzarato; April 20, 1992), known professionally as Gigi Gorgeous Getty, is a Canadian YouTuber, socialite, actress, and model.

In 2008, Lazzarato began uploading video blogs onto streaming platform YouTube as Gregory Gorgeous. Her videos achieved popularity and established an online following. During the following years, Lazzarato uploaded regularly to the channel along with creating and starring in the reality program The Avenue (2011–2013). Following a brief hiatus, she gained media attention after coming out as a transgender woman in 2013, and began going by Gigi Gorgeous. During 2014, Lazzarato personally documented her gender transition through social media profiles, notably through videos revolving around cosmetic procedures, which obtained viral status. In 2016, an incident involving Lazzarato being deported from Dubai due to her status as a transgender woman, resulted in widespread media coverage. Lazzarato was the subject of This is Everything: Gigi Gorgeous (2017), a Barbara Kopple-directed documentary that followed life going through gender transition. The film premiered at the Sundance Film Festival and went on to have a limited theatrical release and several accolades including a Streamy.

Besides personality work, Lazzarato has dabbled in acting and modeling work. Her performance credits include starring in fellow YouTuber Shane Dawson's short film I Hate Myselfie (2015) and its sequel, along with guest appearances in television series Project Runway All Stars, Me and My Grandma, Good Work, and Trailblazers, amongst others. Through modeling, Lazzarato has appeared on the covers of Paper and Fashion, been featured in spreads for Galore, Kode, Refinery29, and Out and served as a frequent muse of August Getty Atelier. In 2019, she authored the book He Said, She Said: Lessons, Stories, and Mistakes From My Transgender Journey.

Early life 
Gigi was born Gregory Allan Lazzarato, the child of Judith Lazzarato (née Belding) and David Lazzarato, a business executive who served as independent director of The Stars Group, chief executive officer of Craig Wireless, and chief financial officer of Alliance Atlantis. She is of Italian, Lebanese, English and French heritage and she was raised in the Roman Catholic faith.

As a young adult, Gigi was a nationally ranked diving champion. Gigi's mother, Judith, died of leukemia on February 3, 2012, at Princess Margaret Cancer Centre, Toronto.

Career

2008–13: Beginnings on YouTube 
Gigi operated a makeup tutorial YouTube channel that began in 2008 while in the eleventh grade, when a friend mentioned seeing a makeup video by Michelle Phan on YouTube. Gigi first came out at age 16, identifying at the time as a gay male. Since transitioning, her YouTube channel started to include more vlogs, fashion, and lifestyle videos.

On January 18, 2011, Gigi announced The Avenue, a YouTube-based reality series. The show premiered on March 15 of that year on YouTube with distribution by Blip. The show's last episode aired on April 14, 2013.

2014–16: Gender transition and appearances 
Gigi was awarded the LogoTV Trailblazing Social Creator Award in 2014 for being an advocate on behalf of LGBT youth. She frequently attends BeautyCon conventions to meet with fans and sit in on panels about makeup techniques and the cosmetics industry. Gigi has modeled for designer Marco Marco, and walked in the 2014 and 2015 Marco Marco Fashion Shows.

Gigi has used internet celebrity status to bring awareness to transgender issues, the LGBT community, and anti-bullying. Her image was featured in a montage of transgender celebrities in the ABC 20/20 documentary about Caitlyn Jenner's transition.

In early 2015, Gigi starred in fellow YouTuber Shane Dawson's debut short film I Hate Myselfie as Amber. Gigi later reprised the role of Amber in I Hate Myselfie 2.

In June 2015, it was announced that Gigi had teamed up with singer Miley Cyrus and had joined Cyrus' Happy Hippie Foundation's Marie Claire "#InstaPride" campaign. The campaign included a series of photos and an announcement by Cyrus that they were working on a secret project. The project later turned out to be a spread in the magazine Marie Claire featuring them both. Gigi signed a partnership with 'Too Faced Cosmetics' in which Gigi starred in the cosmetic commercial film "Better Than Sex" which premiered on July 9, 2015. At the 2015 MTV Video Music Awards, Gigi, along with a group of drag queens, introduced Miley Cyrus for the debut performance of Dooo It! from Cyrus's new album Miley Cyrus and her Dead Petz.

She appeared on Entertainment Tonight as a special guest that same month. Gigi was featured in Kylie Jenner's app "Kylie" that feature several make up tip videos. On September 18, Gigi won the Streamy Award for "Best Beauty Series". It was announced on October 7 that she would star in Adam Lambert's video for her song "Another Lonely Night".

2016: Dubai incident 
On August 9, 2016, Gigi was detained in the United Arab Emirates. Her passport was taken by airport officials and immigration officers at the Dubai International Airport. She was denied entry to Dubai for "imitation of women by men", as the government does not recognize Gigi's gender as legitimate, even though, according to Gigi, "The gender on my passport states female and not male." The "imitation of women by men" is illegal in the UAE, and violators can face up to a year in jail. She was released after being detained for five hours.

The "#JusticeForGigi" hashtag surfaced on Twitter, with fans and supporters calling for Gigi's release and a reform in anti-LGBTQ laws. It was not the first time a transgender person was detained in Dubai. In 2014, two Brazilian transgender women were also detained and had their passports taken. Gigi, before leaving Dubai for Sweden, responded to the incident by calling for equality and legal protections for LGBTQ people.

2017–present: This is Everything 
In January 2017, the documentary This Is Everything: Gigi Gorgeous, starring Gigi, directed by Barbara Kopple premiered at the Sundance Film Festival. On June 11, Gorgeous watched the documentary with Katy Perry on Perry's four-day livestream event, Katy Perry Live: Witness World Wide.

In June 2017, Gigi was named to the Time magazine list of the 25 most influential people on the Internet.

In 2019, Gigi published a memoir, titled He Said, She Said: Lessons, Stories, and Mistakes From My Transgender Journey. In October 2019, Gigi announced a makeup collection coming out with Ipsy in November 2019. The collection features various beauty products related to makeup.

Personal life 
In October 2014, Gigi began dating Cory Binney, the half-brother of drag queen Alaska Thunderfuck, after meeting at a club. Their relationship was on and off until they broke up in May or June 2015. The break-up inspired one of Gigi's most viewed videos titled "Single Life (My Break Up)", a music video to "What the Hell" by Avril Lavigne. It is now one of Gigi's top 5 most viewed videos of all time with 7.5 million views. They got back together in July 2015 before permanently splitting in November 2015. Gigi, who had previously identified as a gay man and then later bisexual, came out as a lesbian in a YouTube video on September 14, 2016. Gigi began dating Nats Getty, an heir and member of the Getty family, shortly after meeting him at Paris Fashion Week while working as a model for Getty's brother, August Getty. In March 2018, Getty proposed to Gigi at the Château de Vaux-le-Vicomte in France. On July 12, 2019, Gigi and Getty married in a private ceremony at Rosewood Miramar Beach in Montecito, California. Guests at the wedding included Ariadne Getty, Caitlyn Jenner, Teri Hatcher, Moj Mahdara, Justin Tranter, Bonnie McKee, Grace Helbig, Hannah Hart, and Trisha Paytas. The couple were given toasts by Katy Perry, Orlando Bloom, and Governor Gavin Newsom of California. On April 9, 2021, Gigi identified herself as pansexual, after releasing a YouTube video, explaining how she "didn't fall in love with Nats because of his gender, but the person that he is."

Gigi is a practicing Roman Catholic and describes herself as religious.

Transition 
Gigi came out as a transgender woman in December 2013. Since then, she has undergone electrolysis, tracheal shave, hormone replacement therapy, facial feminization surgery, rhinoplasty, and breast augmentation. On March 8, 2014, Gigi legally changed her name to Gigi Loren Lazzarato.

In a September 2015 issue of People, Gigi credited "transgender model and performing artist Amanda Lepore and the death of my mother for sparking my transition."

Filmography

Film

Television

Music videos

Awards

References

External links 

 
Gigi Gorgeous on YouTube
 

1992 births
21st-century Canadian actresses
Activists from Montreal
Actresses from Montreal
Actresses from Ontario
Anglophone Quebec people
Artists from Montreal
Artists from Ontario
Businesspeople from Montreal
Businesspeople from Ontario
Canadian bloggers
Canadian female divers
Female models from Quebec
Canadian make-up artists
Canadian people of French descent
Canadian people of Italian descent
Canadian people of Lebanese descent
Canadian Roman Catholics
Canadian YouTubers
Canadian socialites
George Brown College alumni
Getty family
LGBT divers
Canadian LGBT rights activists
LGBT Roman Catholics
Canadian LGBT sportspeople
LGBT YouTubers
Living people
Models from Montreal
Pansexual entertainers
Pansexual actresses
Participants in American reality television series
People from Mississauga
Streamy Award winners
Transgender actresses
Transgender female models
LGBT media personalities
Transgender sportswomen
Transgender rights activists
Fashion YouTubers
Beauty and makeup YouTubers
YouTube vloggers
20th-century Canadian LGBT people
21st-century Canadian LGBT people
Canadian women activists
Muses